Jackie Ledwaba is a South African soccer coach and former player who is assistant manager of Magesi.

Playing career
Ledwaba played as a striker for Zulu Royals, and was top scorer in the South African Premier Division in the 2003–04 season, the same season the club was relegated. He was also invited to train with the South African national team.

Coaching career
Ledwaba has managed Magesi and Phiva Young Stars. In February 2023 he became assistant manager at Magesi.

References

Date of birth missing (living people)
Living people
South African soccer players
AmaZulu F.C. players
South African Premier Division players
Association football forwards
South African soccer managers
Magesi F.C. managers
Year of birth missing (living people)